María Concepción Martínez Horcajada known professionally as María Mahor is a retired Spanish film actress.

Selected filmography
 Legions of the Nile (1959)
 Luxury Cabin (1959)
 Peaches in Syrup (1960)
 The Prince in Chains (1960)
 The Little Colonel (1960)
 Axel Munthe, The Doctor of San Michele (1962)
 The Daughters of Helena (1963)
 Seven Vengeful Women (1966)
 Blueprint for a Massacre (1967)
 More Dollars for the MacGregors (1970)

References

Bibliography
 Thomas Weisser. Spaghetti Westerns: the Good, the Bad and the Violent. McFarland, 2005.

External links
 

1940 births
Living people
Spanish film actresses
People from Madrid